Helmet Falls is a tiered waterfall located in Kootenay National Park in British Columbia, Canada.

Description
The waterfall drops over the edge of a hanging valley situated on the northeast face of Helmet Mountain and descends down the face of a massive amphitheatre-like cliff. The upper tier is largest, plunging between  into a narrow gorge where the small middle tier is found. As the creek spills out of the canyon, it plunges another  to the valley floor. In addition, resurgent stream spills out of the side of the cliff and joins the upper fall from the east.

The waterfall is fed by Helmet Creek, which itself is formed from the meltwater of West Washmawapta Glacier located atop the aforementioned hanging valley. The creek is a tributary of Vermilion River.

Access
The trailhead is located at the Painted Pots parking lot off Highway 93.

See also
Numa Falls

References

External links

Kootenay National Park
Waterfalls of British Columbia